The Philosophy in 90 Minutes series, written by Paul Strathern, is a series of short introductory biographical overviews on well-known philosophers, set in brief historical context, along with brief impressions of their philosophies. The books are also produced in audio format; read by narrator Robert Whitfield. The series’ intent is to "write about the philosophers' lives, [while] adding in a few of their ideas"

Contents
The books and audio presentations are considered to be outlines of the given philosopher. Interesting anecdotes about the subject are pervasive, and lines are quoted from published works in "an epigraphic style". Each volume contains relevant chronologies, including a chronology of philosophy that is repeated in at least some books. Finally several suggested further reading titles are also included.

Titles in the series
Some titles in series are: Socrates, Plato, Aristotle, Confucius, Machiavelli, Descartes, John Locke, Hegel, Heidegger, Hume, Kant, Marx, Rousseau, Schopenhauer, Spinoza, Kierkegaard, Borges, and Nietzsche.

References

External links
 Works by or about Philosophers in 90 Minutes series in libraries (WorldCat catalog)
 
 

Books about philosophers
History of philosophy
Contemporary philosophical literature